Historically, only a portion of ethnic Armenian athletes and athletes of Armenian descent have competed for Armenia in the Olympic Games. Armenian kings Tiridates III and Varazdat were recorded as champions in the Ancient Olympic Games. The first Armenians to participate in modern Olympics were athletes Mkrtich Mkryan and Vahram Papazyan, who represented the Ottoman Empire at the 1912 Stockholm Games. The first Armenian to win a medal was Hal Haig Prieste, a son of Armenian immigrants, who won a bronze medal in diving at the 1920 Antwerp Games for the United States. Soviet Armenian gymnast Hrant Shahinyan became the first Armenian gold medalist of the modern Olympics in 1952.

From 1952 to 1988, most Armenian athletes represented the Soviet Union. Although Armenia became an independent state in 1991, during the 1992 Barcelona Games Armenia and other former Soviet states (except the Baltic states) were part of the Unified Team. The National Olympic Committee of Armenia was founded in 1990 and became an International Olympic Committee member in 1993. Since the 1994 Winter Olympics in Lillehammer, the Republic of Armenia participates separately, but some Armenian athletes still compete under foreign flags, including ethnic Armenians born abroad and those who emigrated from Armenia.

Ancient Olympic Games
One of the most prominent Armenian kings, Tiridates III, who is best known for adopting Christianity as Armenia's state religion in early 4th century, became a champion in wrestling in the 265th Olympics in 281, aged 22–23. King of Armenia Varazdat (Varasdates) from the Arshakuni dynasty, who reigned between 374 and 378, is the last known champion of the Ancient Olympic Games. He became a champion in fisticuffs at the 291st Olympic Games in 385 A.D., seven years after leaving the Armenian throne.

Modern Olympics

Summer Olympics

By games

By sport

By country

Disqualified athletes 
Ashot Danielyan of Armenia was stripped of his medal and suspended following a positive drug test after winning a bronze medal at the 2000 Sydney Games in Men's +105 kg Weightlifting.
Ara Abrahamian of Sweden was disqualified after winning a bronze medal at the 2008 Beijing Games in Men's Greco-Roman 84 kg Wrestling due to "violating the spirit of fair play."

Winter Olympics

By games

By sport

By country

Armenian coaches
Adam Krikorian, the head coach of the United States women's national water polo team, which won gold medals at the 2012, 2016, and 2020 Olympics.
Brian Goorjian,  the head coach of the Australia men's national basketball team, which won a bronze medal at the 2020 Olympics.
Rafael Arutyunyan, coach of Nathan Chen

See also
Armenia at the Olympics

References
Notes

Citations

Bibliography
 [a list of ethnic Armenian medalists up to 2000]

medalists
Lists of Olympic medalists
Olympic
Olympic medalists for Armenia